European Film Award - Prix Eurimages or European Discovery has been awarded annually since 1988 by the European Film Academy. Originally it was called Young European Film of the Year.

Winners and nominees

1980s

1990s

2000s

2010s

2020s

Award given as Best Young Film or Young European Film of the Year

Most wins for Best Discovery by country

References

External links
 Nominees and winners at the European Film Academy website

Eurimages
Awards established in 1988
1988 establishments in Europe